This is a list of forests in Denmark.

Overview
In the year 2000, Denmark had 4860 km², corresponding to 11% of the Danish territory. Of this, 69% was located in Jutland while 31% was located on the islands. 63% was coniferous forest while 37% was broadleaf forest.

The 10 largest forests in Denmark
In 2004 the Danish Forest and Nature Agency published this list of the 10 largest forests in Denmark:

Forests in Denmark

 Almindingen
 Blåbjerg Klitplantage
 Brøndbyskoven
 Corselitze Skov
 Donnerup Plantage
 Elmelunde Kohave
 Greve Skov
 Gribskov
 Gråstenskovene
 Hammer Bakker 
 Hareskoven
 Hesede Skov 
 Himmelev Skov
 Jægersborg Dyrehave
 Klejsskov 
 Klelund Plantage
 Lundby Bakker
 Marielundsskoven 
 Marselisborgskovene 
 Moesgård Skov
 Ridefogedlukke 
 Riis Skov 
 Rold Skov
 Rosenholm Skov 
 Rørt Skov
 Skagen Klitplantage 
 Store Dyrehave
 Tisvilde Hegn 
 Tranum Aktieplantage 
 Troldbjerg Skov 
 True Skov
 Vandmose Skov
 Vestskoven
 Østerild Klitplantage

References

External links
 Danish Forest and Nature Agency

 
Forests
Denmark